United Nations Security Council Resolution 2075 was unanimously adopted on 16 November 2012. The Council demanded that Sudan immediately and unconditionally redeploy the oil police in Diffra from the Abyei area.

See also 
List of United Nations Security Council Resolutions 2001 to 2100

References

External links
Text of the Resolution at undocs.org

2012 United Nations Security Council resolutions
United Nations Security Council resolutions concerning Sudan
2012 in Sudan
November 2012 events